Jeff Jimerson (born May 15, 1955 in Pittsburgh) is a Pittsburgh-based singer, best known as the national anthem singer for the Pittsburgh Penguins for over two decades.  He also performs with Airborne, a Pittsburgh-based band.

In 2011, Bleacher Report named Jimerson one of the eight best national anthem singers in hockey.

Jimerson, credited as "Anthem Singer," sang the national anthem in the 1995 Jean-Claude Van Damme film, Sudden Death.

He performed on the album One Nation Under God.''

Jimerson has also performed with B.E. Taylor.

He is known as The Penguins' Own.

References

Pittsburgh Penguins people
Musicians from Pittsburgh
1955 births
Living people